Jourdanton is a city in and the county seat of Atascosa County, Texas, United States. The population is 4,094. It is part of the San Antonio metropolitan statistical area. The mayor is Robert "Doc" Williams.  The city manager is Bobby J. Martinez.  The police chief is Eric Kaiser.  The fire chief is Jay Fojtik.

History
Jourdanton was founded in 1909 and was named after founder Jourdan Campbell. The county seat was moved from Pleasanton to Jourdanton in 1910.

Geography

At the center of the city is the intersection of Texas State Highways 16 and 97. Highway 16 leads north to San Antonio and south  to Zapata near the Mexican border.

Demographics

2020 census

As of the 2020 United States census, there were 4,094 people, 1,431 households, and 1,039 families residing in the city.

2010 census
At the 2010 census,  3,871 people, 1,187 households, and 923 families were living in the city. The population density was 1,071.1 people per square mile (414.1/km). The 1,353 housing units had an average density of 388.3 per square mile (150.1/km). The racial makeup of the city was 74.44% White, 1.13% African American, 0.96% Native American, 0.29% Asian, 0.03% Pacific Islander, 20.42% from other races, and 2.73% from two or more races. Hispanics or Latinos of any race were 52.87%.

Of the 1,187 households, 44.4% had children under 18 living with them, 58.5% were married couples living together, 15.2% had a female householder with no husband present, and 22.2% were not families. About 19.9% of households were one person and 9.5% were one person 65 or older. The average household size was 2.98, and the average family size was 3.42.

The age distribution was 32.2% under 18, 9.0% from 18 to 24, 29.4% from 25 to 44, 18.6% from 45 to 64, and 10.8% were 65 or older. The median age was 31 years. For every 100 females, there were 95.5 males. For every 100 females age 18 and over, there were 92.3 males.

The median household income was $34,975 and the median family income  was $38,389. Males had a median income of $30,222 versus $16,313 for females. The per capita income for the city was $16,910. About 12.4% of families and 13.4% of the population were below the poverty line, including 13.1% of those under age 18 and 19.3% of those age 65 or over.

Education
Jourdanton is served by the Jourdanton Independent School District and home to the Jourdanton High School Indians and Squaws.

Climate
The climate in this area is characterized by hot, humid summers and generally mild to cool winters.  According to the Köppen climate classification, Jourdanton has a humid subtropical climate, Cfa on climate maps.

References

External links

 Jourdanton Chamber of Commerce
 Handbook of Texas Online article

Cities in Atascosa County, Texas
Cities in Texas
County seats in Texas
Greater San Antonio
Populated places established in 1909
1909 establishments in Texas